Vasil Dgha, or Dgha Vasil (dgha meaning "child, boy"), was the Armenian ruler of Raban and Kaisun. He succeeded his adoptive father, Kogh Vasil, in 1112. Baldwin II, Count of Edessa, tortured Vasil to force him to abandon his domains in 1116. Vasil settled in Constantinople.

References

Sources

 
 
 

12th-century Armenian people
12th-century Byzantine people
Byzantine people of Armenian descent